This is a list of Johns Hopkins Blue Jays players in the NFL Draft.

Key

Selections

References

Lists of National Football League draftees by college football team

Johns Hopkins Blue Jays NFL Draft